Marton is a civil parish in Cheshire East, England. It contains ten buildings that are recorded in the National Heritage List for England as designated listed buildings. Of these, one is listed at Grade I, the highest grade, and the others are at Grade II, the lowest grade. Apart from the village of Marton, the parish is rural. The listed buildings comprise a church with a cross in the churchyard, farmhouses and dwellings.

Key

Buildings

See also

Listed buildings in Eaton
Listed buildings in Gawsworth
Listed buildings in Hulme Walfield
Listed buildings in Lower Withington
Listed buildings in North Rode
Listed buildings in Siddington
Listed buildings in Somerford Booths
Listed buildings in Swettenham

References
Citations

Sources

 

Listed buildings in the Borough of Cheshire East
Lists of listed buildings in Cheshire